The 145th Pennsylvania House of Representatives District is located in Southeastern Pennsylvania and has been represented since 2015 by Craig Staats.

District profile
The 145th Pennsylvania House of Representatives District is located in Bucks County. It is made up of the following areas:

 East Rockhill Township
 Milford Township
 Perkasie
 Quakertown
 Richlandtown
 Richland Township
 Sellersville
 Springfield Township
 Trumbauersville
 West Rockhill Township

Representatives

Recent election results

References

External links
District map from the United States Census Bureau
Pennsylvania House Legislative District Maps from the Pennsylvania Redistricting Commission.  
Population Data for District 145 from the Pennsylvania Redistricting Commission.

145
Government of Bucks County, Pennsylvania